In algebra, a binomial is a polynomial that is the sum of two terms, each of which is a monomial. It is the simplest kind of a sparse polynomial after the monomials.

Definition
A binomial is a polynomial which is the sum of two monomials. A binomial in a single indeterminate (also known as a univariate binomial) can be written in the form

In the context of Laurent polynomials, a Laurent binomial, often simply called a binomial, is similarly defined, but the exponents  and  may be negative.

More generally, a binomial may be written as:

Examples

Operations on simple binomials
The binomial  can be factored as the product of two other binomials:

This is a special case of the more general formula:

When working over the complex numbers, this can also be extended to:

A binomial raised to the th power, represented as  can be expanded by means of the binomial theorem or, equivalently, using Pascal's triangle. For example, the square  of the binomial  is equal to the sum of the squares of the two terms and twice the product of the terms, that is:

The numbers (1, 2, 1) appearing as multipliers for the terms in this expansion are the binomial coefficients two rows down from the top of Pascal's triangle. The expansion of the th power uses the numbers  rows down from the top of the triangle.
An application of the above formula for the square of a binomial is the "-formula" for generating Pythagorean triples:
 Binomials that are sums or differences of cubes can be factored into smaller-degree polynomials as follows:

See also
Completing the square
Binomial distribution
List of factorial and binomial topics (which contains a large number of related links)

Notes

References
 

Algebra
Factorial and binomial topics